Peter of Bourbon-La Marche (1342 – 1362 in Lyon) was the eldest son of James I, Count of La Marche and Jeanne of Chatillon, and was a French prince du sang.

He was knighted by his father shortly before the Battle of Brignais, in which both father and son fought. Both were mortally wounded during the battle, but were carried away by their soldiers to Lyon. He survived his father only a short while, and was succeeded by his brother John.

References

Sources

1342 births
1362 deaths
Bourbon-La Marche, Peter 02 of
Counts of La Marche
Military personnel killed in action
14th-century peers of France